Fantasie for Solo Clarinet is a solo instrumental work by Jörg Widmann and was composed in 1993. It is a showpiece. It offers a Romantic melodious sound with dance, klezmer and jazz music elements in a "Harlequin spirit".

History
The Fantasie for Solo Clarinet, composed in 1993, is one of Widmann’s earliest compositions. He was inspired by Igor Stravinsky's Three Pieces for Solo Clarinet (1919) and Pierre Boulez's Dialogue de l'ombre double (1985) for clarinet and tape. Widmann had in mind the Harlequin figure from the Italian commedia dell'arte. The piece was premiered  by the composer on 1 March 1994 at Bayerischer Rundfunk in Munich.

Music
Widmann wrote the Fantasie, when he was just twenty years old. It's an expression of "youthful exuberance" with "virtuoso flourishes". He combines conventional playing with extended techniques (multiphonics, flutter-tonguing, key clicks), and non-pitched sounds. Widmann’s skills in clarinet playing helped him in composing his Fantasie. The piece is full of extremes in dynamic, tempo, and character. According to Widmann, the opening multiphonic of the Fantasie is being a parody of new music, since many new works of that time begin in a similar manner. Widmann identifies harmony as the central theme of the work. A typical sound are glissandos in the upper registers, in a klezmer or "exaggeratedly jazzy" style. Silences are important. Widmann notates them as a breath mark, a breath mark with a fermata, and an actual rest. Near the beginning is a melody from The Rite of Spring.

Structure
Sections:
 Free, rhapsodically
 Fast, brilliant
 Presto possible
 Tempo come prima, ma poco più mosso

Reception
The Fantasie is one of Widmann’s most frequently performed works and is standard repertory of unaccompanied works for clarinet. Zachary Woolfe from The New York Times wrote: "...sounding like the most beautiful circus music ever written."

Recordings
 Bettina Aust and Robert Aust, Bettina Aust – Deutscher Musikwettbewerb, Laureate 2015, Clarinet, Recorded at Ehemalige Sendestelle des Deutschlandradios, 16–19 October 2015, GENUIN classics, GEN 16432, 2016, compact disc. 
 Eduard Brunner, Music for Solo Clarinet, Recorded in Studio 2, Bayerischer Rundfunk, Munich, 14–15 December 2009, Naxos, 8.572470, 2011, compact disc. 
 Stefan Neubauer, Solitary Changes, Recorded between 2012–2013, Orlando Records, or 0006, 2013.

Notes

References

Sources

Further reading
 

Compositions by Jörg Widmann
Solo clarinet pieces
1993 compositions